Robert Holmes (September 14, 1852 – March 21, 1932) was a publisher and political figure in Ontario, Canada. He represented Huron West in the House of Commons of Canada from 1899 to 1904 as a Liberal.

He was born in St. Catharines, Canada West. He was mayor of Trenton for four years. Holmes was first elected to the House of Commons in an 1899 by-election held after Malcolm Colin Cameron was named Lieutenant-Governor of the Northwest Territories. He ran unsuccessfully for re-election to the House of Commons in 1904 and 1908.

References 

1852 births
1932 deaths
Liberal Party of Canada MPs
Mayors of places in Ontario
Members of the House of Commons of Canada from Ontario
Politicians from St. Catharines